A specialty store is a shop/store that carries a deep assortment of brands, styles, or models within a relatively narrow category of goods. Furniture stores, florists, sporting goods stores, and bookstores are all specialty stores. Stores such as Athlete’s Foot (sports shoes only) are considered superspecialty stores.

Specialty stores compete with other types of retailers such as department stores, big box stores, general stores, supermarkets and variety stores.

References

Retail formats